Umbrella tree can refer to several items:

Under the Umbrella Tree, a 1986 children's television program
Maesopsis eminii
Melia azedarach
Magnolia tripetala, the umbrella magnolia
Musanga cecropioides, the African corkwood
Polyscias murrayi, an Australian rainforest tree
Schefflera actinophylla, the umbrella tree or octopus tree
Schefflera arboricola, the dwarf umbrella tree
Terminalia catappa, the Indian almond

See also
Umbrella plant
Pinus pinea, the stone pine, sometimes called "umbrella pine"
Sciadopitys verticillata, the Kusamaki, sometimes called "Japanese umbrella pine"